Charles Rodney Rundle (17 January 1923 in Fowey – 1997) was an English professional footballer who played for St Blazey, Tottenham Hotspur, Crystal Palace and Dartford.

Playing career
Rundle began his football career at non-League club St Blazey. 

The inside forward joined Tottenham Hotspur in February 1946. Rundle scored on his debut in a 2-1 victory over Southampton at White Hart Lane in September 1946.  He went on to score 12 goals in 29 senior matches in all competitions. 

He transferred to Crystal Palace in June 1950 and featured in a further 38 games and found the net twice between 1950 and 1951. 

After leaving Selhurst Park he ended his competitive career at Dartford.

References

External links

Crystal Palace stats
Spurs team photo-1949

1923 births
1997 deaths
People from Fowey
English footballers
English Football League players
St Blazey A.F.C. players
Tottenham Hotspur F.C. players
Crystal Palace F.C. players
Dartford F.C. players
Association football forwards